Ashenden or Ashendon may refer to:

People:
 Martin Ashenden (born 1937), English former cricketer
 Scott Ashenden (born 1939), Australian politician
 Gavin Ashenden (born 1954), English academic, author, journalist

Places:
 Ashendon, Western Australia, Australia, a suburb of Perth
 Ashendon Hundred, a former hundred in the county of Buckinghamshire, England
 Ashendon, a village and civil parish in Buckinghamshire
 Ashendon Junction, a former major railway junction in Buckinghamshire

Entertainment:
 the title character of Ashenden: Or the British Agent, a collection of stories by W. Somerset Maugham
 Ashenden (TV series), a 1991 BBC British spy drama series based on Maugham's stories